Brume is a surname. It is also an English and French word for mist. Notable people with the surname include:

 Ese Brume (born 1996), Nigerian athlete
 Fred Aghogho Brume (1942–2011), Nigerian politician

See also
 Brum (surname)
 Brumm (surname)